École nationale supérieure de chimie de Mulhouse (ENSCMu) a French engineering College created in 1977.

It was the first school of chemistry to be founded in France, in 1822, by companies whose objective was to develop the training of their employees.

Located in Mulhouse, the ENSCMu is a public higher education institution. The school is a member of the University of Upper Alsace.

Notable Teacher 
 Michel Rohmer, a French chemist specialising in the chemistry of micro-organisms

References

External links
 ENSCMu

Engineering universities and colleges in France
ENSCMu
Mulhouse
Educational institutions established in 1977
1977 establishments in France